Hebrew Institute of Boro Park (HIBP, also known as Yeshivas Etz Chaim/Etz Hayim) is a defunct private school in New York City. It was the first Jewish day school in Borough Park, Brooklyn.

History
Founded in 1916, the school was the first yeshiva (Jewish day school) in Borough Park. It was located at 5000 13th Avenue.

Enrollment
During its heyday, the school had three parallel classes through grade 6, and two parallel classes for grades 7 and 8. The loss of a class was partly due to those parents who subsequently sent their sons to (public) Junior High School. It went from having approximately 600 students during the mid-1960s to an estimated 200 students by 1970.

Principals
 Rabbi Israel D. Lerner
 Rabbi Moshe I. Shulman
 Max Kufeld, 1st English Principal
 Mrs. Bella Nemiroff, (unofficial) English Principal
 Dr. Hochberg (principal after Israel Lerner)
 Rabbi Jerome Karlin (principal 1970 - 1977)
 Rabbi Akiva Wadler (1978 - final year of the school)

Other yeshivas
By the time the yeshiva closed, the area was becoming more Hasidic. However, the area still featured two other long-time non-Hasidic schools; Shulamith, a girls' school and another boys school, Toras Emes, which was seven blocks away. Both these schools later moved to Flatbush.

Shulamith was two buildings, one of them partially using the nearby Young Israel of Boro Park, the other directly across YIBP. Both of these buildings were sold to Viznitz Yeshiva.

Foundation
Etz Chaim's building was sold and the proceeds were used to establish the Yeshiva Etz Chaim Foundation to support religious education.
(Retired) Judge Jerome Hornblass was an early administrator.

An alumni reunion was held in 1997 for the graduates of the school which "was located in a beautiful building on 13th Avenue between 50 and 51st Streets." That building has since been demolished; several stores and a bank are now on that block.

Notable students
 Zachary Baumel (1960-1982), American-Israeli soldier

References

External links
 Class of 1953, reunion
 re Pre WW II Boro Park: See "Were there any yeshivas there?"

Defunct private schools in the United States
Defunct schools in New York City
Educational institutions established in 1916
Jewish day schools in New York (state)
Orthodox yeshivas in Brooklyn
Private middle schools in Brooklyn
Borough Park, Brooklyn
1916 establishments in New York City